This is a list of international motorsport championships, trophies and cups administered and regulated by the Fédération Internationale de l'Automobile (FIA), the international governing body of motorsport. The FIA awards the winners titles and/or trophies to the competitors, while working with other promoters who may arrange the commercial affairs of the series.

Seven series are sanctioned as World Championships: FIA Formula One World Championship, FIA World Rally Championship, FIA World Rallycross Championship, FIA World Endurance Championship, FIA Karting World Championship, FIA World Rally Raid Championship and FIA Formula E World Championship. An eighth event, the FIA World Touring Car Championship was discontinued at the end of 2017 and replaced by the FIA World Touring Car Cup, which had World Cup status until its demise.

Current

Former
 FIA World Sportscar Championship
 FIA Sportscar Championship
 FIA International Formula 3000
 FIA Formula Two Championship
 FIA Formula 3 International Trophy
 FIA European Formula Three Cup
 FIA GT Championship
 FIA GT1 World Championship
 FIA GT Series
 FIA Touring Car World Cup
 FIA World Touring Car Championship
 FIA European Touring Car Cup
 GP2 Series
 GP3 Series
 FIA World Touring Car Cup
 FIA Alternative Energies Cup
 FIA Junior World Rally Championship
 FIA Super 2000 World Rally Championship
 FIA Production World Rally Championship

References